Algimantė Mikutaitė (born 7 December 1996) is a Lithuanian footballer who plays as a defender and has appeared for the Lithuania women's national team.

Career
From the 2012 season she played for Lithianian champions FC Gintra, remaining with the club for ten years.

In January 2022 she signed with Catalan club SE AEM.

Mikutaitė has been capped for the Lithuania national team, appearing for the team during the 2019 FIFA Women's World Cup qualifying cycle.

References

External links
 
 
 

1996 births
Living people
Lithuanian women's footballers
Women's association football defenders
Gintra Universitetas players
SE AEM players
Segunda Federación (women) players
Lithuania women's international footballers
Lithuanian expatriate footballers
Lithuanian expatriate sportspeople in Spain
Expatriate women's footballers in Spain